Ceroxys hortulana is a species of picture-winged fly in the genus Ceroxys of the family Ulidiidae found in the Czech Republic, Austria, Bosnia Herzegovina, Corsica, Croatia, France, Germany, Italy, Lithuania, Moldova, Poland, Portugal, Romania, Hungary, Slovakia, Ukraine, and Russia.

References

Ulidiidae
Insects described in 1790
Diptera of Europe
Taxa named by Pietro Rossi